Saint-Victor-la-Coste (Provençal Occitan: Sent Victor de la Còsta) is a commune in the Gard department in the Occitania region in Southern France. In 2019, it had a population of 2,135.

Built against a hill overlooking a plain covered with vineyards with the Rhône Valley in the distance, the town was once part of the medieval domain of the Sabran family, vassals to the Count of Toulouse.

Demographics

Sights
Interesting sights include an 11th-century church and a 13th-century fort, known locally as Le Castellas, and which was restored by the French volunteer organization La Sabranenque.

Wine
There are several wineries in the village producing Côtes du Rhone wines.

See also
Communes of the Gard department

References

External links

City council website

Communes of Gard